The following is the results of the Iran Super League 2010/11 basketball season, Persian Gulf Cup.

Regular season

Standings

Results

Relegation

Playoffs

Semifinals 
Mahram vs. Towzin Electric

Zob Ahan vs. Petrochimi

Final 
Mahram vs. Zob Ahan

Final standings

References
 Asia Basket
 Iranian Basketball Federation

Iranian Basketball Super League seasons
League
Iran